Maj-Lena Lundström (born 29 December 1941) is a retired Swedish athlete. She won the national titles in high jump (1958), 80 m hurdles (1959 and 1962), 100 m (1962), pentathlon (1959) and 4 × 200 m relay (1961). She placed sixth in the high jump, her strongest event, at the 1958 European Championships in Stockholm.

References

1941 births
Living people
Swedish female sprinters
Swedish female hurdlers
Swedish female high jumpers